Robert Butler (1897-1955) was the United States Ambassador to Australia (1946–48) and Cuba (1948–1951). He died of a heart attack on September 15, 1955. Butler was born in St. Paul, Minnesota and his wife was Margaret Porter.

During World War II he was active in shipbuilding. He was the president of Walter Butler Shipbuilders Inc. and Walter Butler Shipbuilding-Duluth which built a number of cargo ships in Duluth, Minnesota and Superior, Wisconsin during the war.

According to a former aide, Butler had been the focus of an assassination plot during his term as Ambassador to Cuba.

A large statue of Cuban independence leader Jose Marti inside City Hall in St. Paul, Minnesota, was presented to the city "in appreciation of [Butler's] courageous work in creating a warm feeling between our two countries."

References

External links 

1955 deaths
1897 births
People from White Bear Lake, Minnesota
Ambassadors of the United States to Australia
Ambassadors of the United States to Cuba